Joseph Anthony Irudayaraj (4 October 1935 – 29 November 2019) was an Indian Roman Catholic bishop.

Irudayaraj was born in India and was ordained to the priesthood in 1965. He served as bishop of the Roman Catholic Diocese of Dharmapuri, India, from 1997 to 2012.

Notes

1935 births
2019 deaths
21st-century Roman Catholic bishops in India
20th-century Roman Catholic bishops in India